The Pembroke Lumber Kings are a Junior "A" ice hockey team from Pembroke, Ontario, Canada. They are a part of the Central Canada Hockey League and are the winningest team in CCHL (formerly CJHL) history as well as 2011 Royal Bank Cup National Junior A Champions.

History
The Pembroke Lumber Kings are the oldest member of the CCHL, having begun operations in 1961. However, in 1979–80 the Lumber Kings were suspended for one season and replaced with the Pembroke Royals. The Pembroke Lumber Kings were approved to rejoin the league for 1980–81.

The Pembroke Lumber Kings won a total of 14 Art Bogart Cup league championships between 1973 and 2011. Six of those championships came in the 1980s when the Kings were coached by Jim Farelli. Farelli coached 420 games for the Kings, the most of any coach in Lumber Kings history.  His teams advanced to the Art Bogart Cup championship series eight consecutive years, winning six titles. This included three consecutive chanpionships from 1987 to 1989, tying the record for longest streak set by the Cornwall Royals (1966–1968).

The Kings had previously won three Art Bogart Cups in the 1970s.  The 1972–73 team was coached by Mac MacLean and made it to the Centennial Cup Canadian Junior A Final, losing 4 games to 1 to the Portage la Prairie Terriers.  Under coach Bryan Murray the Kings won consecutive titles in 1977 and 1978. The 1977 team made it to the Centennial Cup Final, losing to the Prince Albert Raiders. Murray was fired by the Lumber Kings after the 1978 season. Three years later he was starting a long NHL coaching/general manager career as coach of the Washington Capitals.

The Lumber Kings broke their own (shared) league record by winning five consecutive Art Bogart Cup championships from 2007 to 2011, appearing in five Fred Page Cup tournaments for the Eastern Canada Junior A championships (2006 as hosts), winning in 2007 and 2011, and finishing as finalists in 2006, 2008, and 2010. In 2011, the Pembroke Lumber Kings became only the second team since the 1976 Rockland Nationals to win the National Junior A championship. The team was led by owner, coach and general manager Sheldon Keefe, who had purchased the Kings in June 2006.

Keefe announced on May 29, 2013, that he had sold the Pembroke Lumber Kings to former Calgary Flames player (9 games) and Eganville native Dale McTavish. With Keefe no longer in charge of ownership, general management and coaching duties, the Lumber Kings' success began to fade away, despite making the league finals in 2015, losing to Carleton Place; and failing to qualify for the playoffs for the first time in 13 years in 2017.

The team was sold to Alex Armstrong in June 2019.

Notable alumni
Dainius Zubrus, (1995–96) played for the Philadelphia Flyers, Montreal Canadiens, Washington Capitals, Buffalo Sabres, New Jersey Devils, and San Jose Sharks from 1996 to 2016.
Mike Eastwood, (1984–85) played for the Toronto Maple Leafs, Winnipeg Jets, Phoenix Coyotes, New York Rangers, St. Louis Blues, Chicago Blackhawks, and Pittsburgh Penguins from 1992 to 2004. 
Peter White, (1986–88) played for the Edmonton Oilers, Toronto Maple Leafs, Philadelphia Flyers, and Chicago Blackhawks from 1993 to 2004.
Eric Selleck (2005–06) played for the Florida Panthers and is currently a member of the Arizona Coyotes organization playing for the Tucson Roadrunners.
Dmytro Yakushyn (1995–96) played for the Toronto Maple Leafs in 2 games in 1999–2000
Joe Reekie (1981–82) played for the Buffalo Sabres, New York Islanders, Tampa Bay Lightning, Washington Capitals, and Chicago Blackhawks from 1985 to 2002. 
Dale McTavish (1988–89) played for the Calgary Flames in 1996–97 (9 games) and last played pro hockey for SaiPa and Blues of the Liiga from 1997 to 2000 and again in 2010–2011 season. He is currently owner and general manager of the Lumber Kings.
His son, Mason McTavish, also a Lumber Kings alum (2018–19), was selected 3rd overall in the 2021 NHL Entry Draft by the Anaheim Ducks.
P.J. Stock (1992–93) played for New York Rangers, Montreal Canadiens, Philadelphia Flyers, and Boston Bruins from 1997 to 2004.
Matthew Peca played for the Tampa Bay Lightning, Montreal Canadiens and Ottawa Senators.
Tim Young (1972–73) played for the Minnesota North Stars, Winnipeg Jets and Philadelphia Flyers.

Retired numbers
8 – Ben Reinhardt (2006–11), winner of five CCHL championships, two Fred Page Cup championships, and one Royal Bank Cup championship.
11 – Gale Linton (1971–72), killed in a car accident while reporting to training camp on October 1, 1972.
16 – Larry Mick (1963–66), drafted by the Minnesota North Stars 13th overall in the 1967 NHL Amateur Draft.

Season by season record

Note: GP = Games Played, W = Wins, L = Losses, T = Ties, OTL = Overtime Losses, SOL = Shootout Losses, GF = Goals for, GA = Goals against, Pts = Points

(*) denotes the removal of 9 points from Pembroke's totals by the CJHL for disciplinary reasons.
The Lumber Kings lost their franchise prior to the start of the 1979-80 season for failing to remain in good standing with the league.

Fred Page Cup 
Eastern Canada Championships
MHL - QAAAJHL - CCHL - Host
Round robin play with 2nd vs 3rd in semi-final to advance against 1st in the finals.

 * Tournament Host

Royal Bank Cup
CANADIAN NATIONAL CHAMPIONSHIPS
Dudley Hewitt Champions - Central, Fred Page Champions - Eastern, Western Canada Cup Champions - Western, Western Canada Cup - Runners Up and Host
Round robin play with top 4 in semi-final and winners to finals.

 * Tournament Host

Championships
CJHL Art Bogart Cup Championships: 1973, 1977, 1978, 1982, 1984, 1985, 1987, 1988, 1989, 2007, 2008, 2009, 2010, 2011
Central Canadian Dudley Hewitt Cup Championships: 1973, 1977, 1987, 1988
Eastern Canadian Fred Page Cup Championships: 2007, 2011
CJAHL Royal Bank Cup Championships: 2011

References

External links[edit source] 

 Lumberkings.Webpage

Central Canada Hockey League teams
Ice hockey clubs established in 1964
Pembroke, Ontario
1964 establishments in Ontario